Major General Jayanath Lokuketagodage, RSP, USP is a senior Sri Lanka Army officer. He was the Sri Lankan High Commissioner to Pakistan from 2016 to 2019. 

Having joined the Sri Lanka Army in 1980, Lokuketagodage received his basic officer training at the Sri Lanka Military Academy and was commissioned into the Sri Lanka Sinha Regiment. He went on to serve as the commanding officer, Sri Lanka United Nation Peace keeping troops in Haiti; Centre Commandant, Sri Lanka Sinha Regiment; Brigade Commander, 553 Brigade and Commander of Security Forces Headquarters before his retirement from the army in 2015.

References

High Commissioners of Sri Lanka to Pakistan
Sri Lankan major generals
Sinhalese military personnel
Sinha Regiment officers
Sri Lanka Military Academy graduates
Living people
Year of birth missing (living people)